Zou Run is a fictional character in Water Margin, one of the Four Great Classical Novels of Chinese literature. Nicknamed "Single Horned Dragon", he ranks 91st among the 108 Stars of Destiny and 55th among the 72 Earthly Fiends.

Background
The novel depicts Zou Run as odd-looking and huge-sized. He is nicknamed "Single Horned Dragon" because he has a large bump on his head. The nickname becomes even more fitting after he butted a tree in a fit of anger amid an argument and broke it.

Zou Run and his uncle Zou Yuan, who is about his age, lead a group of outlaws at Mount Dengyun near Laizhou. They practise the principle of robbing the rich to help the poor. The Zous are close friends of Sun Xin as well as Yang Lin, Deng Fei and Shi Yong of Liangshan Marsh.

Joining Liangshan
The Xie brothers (Xie Zhen and Xie Bao) are arrested in Dengzhou (登州; in present-day eastern Shandong) for smashing up the house of one Squire Mao who has pocketed the tiger they shot to claim reward at the prefectural office. Yue He, a jailer in the prison and a distant relative of the Xies, takes the news to their cousin Gu Dasao, warning that the brothers could be murdered in prison. Gu's husband Sun Xin enlists the Zous to help in the rescue. Sun Xin also compels his brother Sun Li, the garrison commandant of Dengzhou, to join the plan. After they extricated the Xies from prison, the group flee to join the Liangshan Marsh.

Before going up to the stronghold, Sun Li volunteers to infiltrate the Zhu Family Manor, which Liangshan has failed to take in two offensives. As Sun Li has learnt combat from the same teacher as Luan Tingyu, the martial arts instructor of the manor, he wins the confidence of the Zhus. Zou Run, together with Zou Yuan, Sun Xin, Gu Dasao, the Xie brothers and Yue He, goes on a rampage inside the manor, taking it by surprise, when Sun Li gives his signal. The fall of the Zhu Family Manor is a great contribution by the group before their acceptance into Liangshan.

Campaigns
Zou Run is appointed as one of the leaders of the Liangshan infantry after the 108 Stars of Destiny came together in what is called the Grand Assembly. He participates in the campaigns against the Liao invaders and rebel forces in Song territory following amnesty from Emperor Huizong for Liangshan.

Zou Run is one of the few Liangshan heroes who survive the campaigns. Although conferred the title "Martial Gentleman of Grace", he declines the honour and returns to his hometown where he lives as a commoner.

References
 
 
 
 
 
 
 

72 Earthly Fiends
Fictional characters from Shandong